The Plant City, Arcadia, and Gulf Railroad was a railroad line that once operated from Plant City, Florida, south to Welcome, a distance of about 13 miles.    The line remains in service today and is owned by CSX Transportation, which it operates as their Plant City Subdivision.

History
The Plant City, Arcadia, and Gulf Railroad was first built as a logging railroad in 1898 by the Warnell Lumber & Veneer Company.  It connected to the Florida Central and Peninsular Railroad in Plant City, which would become the main line of the Seaboard Air Line Railroad in 1900.  

The Seaboard Air Line bought the Plant City, Arcadia, and Gulf Railroad in 1905 and rebuilt it.  The line notably served Coronet Industries phosphate processing plant.  Seaboard would also build a line from just south of Keysville (at a point which would then be known as Welcome Junction) east to Mulberry and Bartow in 1912.  This line would be extended to Lake Wales by 1916.  Track south of Welcome Junction to Welcome is now abandoned.

In 1925, Seaboard built the Valrico Cutoff which connected the line at Welcome Junction with the Seaboard main line (CSX's S Line) at Valrico.  This connection provided a shorter route from the Bone Valley to Tampa. 
The Valrico Cutoff and track east of Welcome Junction became Seaboard's Valrico Subdivision. 

From 1926 to 1952, the Seaboard would designate the former Plant City, Arcadia, and Gulf Railroad as the northernmost segment of their Fort Myers Subdivision (which would overlap the Valrico Subdivision from Welcome Junction a short distance to Edison Junction, where Seaboard's track continued south and connected to Fort Myers at the time).  

By 1940, the line would be used by Seaboard's local passenger trains to Boca Grande as well as their Cross Florida Limited (which ran from Tampa to Miami).  

After abandonment of Seaboard's track to Fort Myers, the line was considered a spur of the Valrico Subdivision.

Current operations 

Through many mergers, the Seaboard Air Line Railroad network became part of CSX Transportation in 1980.  Today, the former Plant City, Arcadia, and Gulf Railroad operates as CSX's Plant City Subdivision and still runs from Plant City to Welcome Junction.

At the north end, the Plant City Subdivision connects with CSX's S Line (former Seaboard main line) just south of Plant City Interlocking (where the S Line and A Line cross). The junction with the S Line towards Tampa is still known today as Lake Wales Junction (which references that this was once the Seaboard Air Line's access to Lake Wales despite the fact that the track no longer continues there).  The Plant City Subdivision’s connection to the S Line in the northbound direction (which was relocated north of the A Line in the 1990s) is known as Sandler Junction.

For the most part, the Plant City Subdivision is only used for local freight today.  While trains once could run the line at 40 miles per hour, its speed limit has been reduced to 25 miles per hour to reduce maintenance costs.

Historic Stations

See also
 List of CSX Transportation lines

References

CSX Transportation lines
Defunct Florida railroads
Predecessors of the Seaboard Air Line Railroad
Transportation in Hillsborough County, Florida